Trucov is an open source code coverage analysis tool for GCC versions 4.0 and later that aims to be a gcov replacement.  Trucov improves upon gcov by providing more granular and machine readable output, such as DOT Files representing control-flow graph of the program.  The use of DOT Files allows for other common tools like GraphViz to be used to produce coverage graphs. Trucov was developed as a senior design project at Washington State University.

Features
 Produces coverage analysis on a per source, per function, and per branch level
 Provides both textual and graphical coverage reports that are easier to use and understand
 Automatically finds all the source files inside of a project
 Detects how many times a particular block or branch of code has been executed
 Generates the control-flow graph of each function per source file
 Optionally hides coverage information of external libraries to better focus on the product under test
 Allows user to narrow the scope of coverage information by specifying specific functions or files

References

External links
 Trucov homepage

Free software testing tools